The 9th Annual Gotham Independent Film Awards, presented by the Independent Filmmaker Project, were held on September 22, 1999 and were hosted by Sandra Bernhard. At the ceremony, Meryl Streep was honored with a Career Tribute, composer Carter Burwell received the Below-the-Line Award and independent film producer Christine Vachon was awarded the Producer/Industry Executive Award.

Winners and nominees

Breakthrough Actor
 Dylan Baker – Happiness (TIE) 
 Janet McTeer – Tumbleweeds (TIE)

Breakthrough Director (Open Palm Award)
 David Riker – The City
 Tim Kirkman – Dear Jesse
 Eric Mendelsohn – Judy Berlin
 Mark Polish and Michael Polish – Twin Falls Idaho
 Frank Whaley – Joe the King

Classical Film Tribute
 Klute

Below-the-Line Award
 Carter Burwell

Producer/Industry Executive Award
 Christine Vachon

Career Tribute
 Meryl Streep

References

External links
 

1999
1999 film awards